Cephalophyllum pillansii is a plant species in the family Aizoaceae, endemic to the western Namaqualand veld in Namibia and South Africa. It has gray-green, succulent leaves, with yellow flowers.

References
 Notes Mesembryanthemum 2: 95 1929.
 Illustrated Handbook of Succulent Plants: Aizoaceae A-E, edited by Heidrun E.K. Hartmann, Springer Science & Business Media, 2012, pages 110-111. .
 The Plant List
 JSTOR
 Encyclopedia of Life

pillansii
Taxa named by Louisa Bolus